Rosenborg Brøndanstalt was a day spa and mineral water factory located in Gothersgade in Copenhagen, Denmark.

History
Rosenborg Brøndanstalt was founded on 23 March 1831 at the initiative of Jonas Collin, medical doctor lægen Ole Bang, and Johan Georg Forchhammer to provide the citizens of Copenhagen with an alternative to visiting spas abroad. First Frederick VI and later Christian VIII contributed to the project by donating a strip of Rosenborg Castle Gardens along Gothersgade. The buildings were built to a design by royal building inspector Jørgen Hansen Koch in 1833.

The popularity of the institution peaked in the 1880s. The day spa attracted some 700 guests a year, while the mineral water factory produced two to three million quarter bottles a year which were sold through pharmacies across the country. The product range included mineral water, limonade and tonic water.

In 1929, Rosenborg Brøndanstalt acquired the mineral water factory Sødring & Co. in Østerbro. The activities of the two companies were the same year moved to a new factory at Bispevej 25in Bispebjerg.

The company was in 1950 headed by Svend Sørensen (1908-). Board members were professor Carl Faurholt (1890-), director L. Tholstrup (1896-) and lawyer J. C. Bang (1913-).

References

External links
 Source

Defunct companies of Denmark
Danish companies established in 1831